The HaSharon Subdistrict is one of Israel's subdistricts in Central District. The subdistrict is composed of most of Mandatory Tulkarm Subdistrict that was occupied by the newly established state of Israel in 1949. The rest of Mandatory Tulkarm Subdistrict to the East of the Green Line constitutes modern Tulkarm Governorate.

The Principal city of this subdistrict is Netanya.

References